Le Juif errant (The Wandering Jew) is a grand opera by Fromental Halévy, with a libretto by Eugène Scribe and Jules-Henri Vernoy de Saint-Georges.

The opera is based extremely loosely on themes of the novel Le Juif errant, by Eugène Sue. Whilst the novel is set in 19th century Paris and the Wandering Jew is incidental to the main story-line, the opera begins in Amsterdam in 1190 and the Jew Ahasuerus (spelled Ashvérus in the opera) is a leading character.

Performance history
Le Juif errant was premiered at the Salle Le Peletier of the Paris Opera on 23 April 1852, and had 48 further performances over two seasons. The music was sufficiently popular to generate a Wandering Jew Mazurka, a Wandering Jew Waltz, a Wandering Jew Polka and in France just in the several months after the opera was premiered an even more considerable quantity of piano works, including several called "Grande fantaisie dramatique" and similar titles, based on the opera.

Roles

References
Notes

Sources

Further reading
 Jordan, Ruth (1994). Fromental Halévy: His Life & Music, 1799–1862. London: Kahn & Averill. .
 Macdonald, Hugh (2001). "Halévy, (Jacques-François-)Fromental(-Elie) [Fromentin(-Elias)]" in The New Grove Dictionary of Music and Musicians, 2nd edition, edited by Stanley Sadie. London: Macmillan.  (hardcover).  (eBook).
 Scribe, Eugène (1858). Le Juif errant in Oeuvres complètes de M. Eugène Scribe, new edition, volume XVII, pp. 149–164. Paris: Adolphe Delahays. View at Google Books.

External links
 
 

Operas
French-language operas
Operas by Fromental Halévy
Grand operas
1852 operas
Opera world premieres at the Paris Opera
Wandering Jew
Libretti by Eugène Scribe